, also known as , is a fictional character introduced in the 2012 Spike Chunsoft visual novel action adventure game Danganronpa 2: Goodbye Despair. Nagito is a high school student from Hope's Peak Academy who gave him the title of "Ultimate Lucky Student" for his supernatural luck, who is first seen in the game's beginning when meeting the protagonist Hajime Hinata as both and multiple other students find themselves trapped in a series of tropical islands. Initially presenting a caring personality, Nagito shows his true maniacal and hope-obsessed demeanor when a bear-like robot, Monokuma, orders the students to participate in a killing game if they want to leave the islands, with Nagito violently encouraging the killing game's progress. The Servant returns in Danganronpa Another Episode: Ultra Despair Girls as the secondary antagonist.

Kazutaka Kodaka created Nagito as a rival to Hajime as well as the successor to the previous Danganronpa protagonist Makoto Naegi with his designs by Rui Komatsuzaki meant to mark him as Hajime's opposite. To reinforce the similarities between Nagito and Makoto, Kodaka had the characters share the same voice actors: Megumi Ogata and Bryce Papenbrook, and their names be anagrams of each other. However, despite the similarities, Nagito and Makoto share no character connections, with Kodaka claiming that the hints were made up to market Goodbye Despair.

Critical response to Nagito's character was positive based on his ambiguous nature in Goodbye Despair where he often changes his personality, as well as his more comical take in the anime prequel Danganronpa 3: The End of Hope's Peak High School. Considered a breakout character, his role as a rival to Hajime and antagonist has also resulted in him being considered one of the best characters in the Danganronpa series.

Creation

Nagito was created to be "an absolute rival" to Hajime Hinata, with Kazutaka Kodaka describing their relationship as similar to that of the Joker to Batman. Komaeda's characterization was aimed to give players a confusing view in regards to Nagito's true self, based on the morally dubious and contradictory actions he committed over the course of the game. In regards to his design, Hajime was the earliest-designed character which generated a major contrast between his white clothing to Nagito's dark clothing. Nagito was written to create a major impact into the game despite not being the lead or antagonist, symbolizing the prominent themes of hope and despair through his actions.

To surprise gamers and suggest the characters are potentially the same person, both Makoto and Nagito share the same voice actress, Ogata. His name, "Nagito Komaeda", was conceived as an anagram for "Naegi Makoto da" ("I am Makoto Naegi") to infer it as a potential pseudonym; Nagito claims the name to be an alias during the third chapter. In 2020, Kodaka revealed the anagram was used to engage fans of Danganronpa: Trigger Happy Havoc because of the lack of pre-release promotion materials for the original version of Goodbye Despair during its release year. This surprised Ogata, as the anagram had been kept secret from the other members who developed the game, including Ogata herself. In 2015, it was later confirmed that he had feelings for an ambiguous "him" in his character song "Poison -Gekiyaku-".

In the development of anime prequel Danganronpa 3: The End of Hope's Peak High School, Kodaka aimed to write the younger Nagito as an unpredictable character that game fans would still recognize, and make it obvious his good luck often aids him in only a random nature in reality compared to the specific nature of the Neo World Program. His character design was aimed to keep the "resembled flickering flames" present in their Servant design, something Kodaka requested to the designer to adapt properly. Kodaka was pleased with how Nagito was written in the anime, further comparing his school life and luck to the Rube Goldberg segment of the PythagoraSwitch educational television program.

Casting

To surprise gamers, Nagito was given Makoto's voice actor, Megumi Ogata. Ogata found trouble when doing the voice for Nagito as she had no clear grasp on understanding him. Komaeda was introduced with the same Lucky Talent as Makoto Naegi. However, the staff considered them opposites based on their ideals of "hope".

Localization member Robert Schiotis felt that finding a voice actor for the latter proved too challenging, as he is meant to clash with Makoto's ideals. In the end, Papenbrook voiced both characters, making the connections between them more interesting according to localization staff. Papenbrook commented that Nagito is both "creepy" and "insane". In the original Japanese series, there is a scene in the finale where Nagito talks in joy while holding hand with Makoto, whom he declares his idol for their similar talents but is taken by his friends before he can finish their interactions. The actor added a line for Nagito that would come across comically as homoerotic and claimed he had fun for making his two characters had a talk.

In the series' stage play, Nagito was played by Hiroki Suzuki.

Appearances

Danganronpa video games
Outwardly presenting as a friendly, upbeat, somewhat meek young man, his true demeanor, revealed following the beginning of Monokuma's killing game, is shown to be quite deranged in his pursuit of hope, believing it to be an absolute good that only his talented classmates can achieve, willing to bring about great despair to create the greatest of hopes. Because of his beliefs, he is completely willing to let his talented classmates walk over him, seeing himself as inferior to them, all while keeping his cheerful, optimistic attitude and frequently referring to himself as a "stepping stone for [their] hope." He manipulates Teruteru Hanamura into killing Byakuya Togami to start the killing game. He remains cheerful and enthusiastic even in horrifying situations when someone has died, which results in his classmates fearing him and finding him creepy. this is compounded by the fact that he is revealed in his Free Time Events to have a degenerative brain disease slowly eating away at his ability to think rationally, which could kill him at any moment. He also feels deep self-loathing over the nature of his talent being, in his mind, lackluster compared to his classmates' talents, seeing himself as not a true "Ultimate" compared to those around him while at the same time expressing disdain for "normal" people like himself.

Despite his self-loathing, Nagito does still see himself as being superior to normal people, and has an intense hatred for the Reserve Course, seeing them as talentless parasites leeching off the academy. In order to rid the island of the other students, he sets up a trap for the others by setting up a scenario to look like he committed suicide, while actually tricking Future Foundation traitor Chiaki Nanami into inadvertently killing him with poison, hoping the result will lead to the execution of all other students including himself and rescue Chiaki alone. However, Hajime realizes what truly happened and Chiaki takes responsibility for Nagito's death, saving the other students. After receiving a series of recorded messages from Nagito and proceeding to what appears to be Hope's Peak Academy, Hajime learns that Nagito, himself, and the others are in actuality computer avatar copies of the terrorist group known as the Remnants of Ultimate Despair existing within a virtual reality created by the Neo World Program, and that "Hajime" himself is their leader Izuru Kamukura – the group's memories having been wiped by Makoto Naegi's Future Foundation offshoot in the hope of providing them redemption, despite being responsible for the deaths of millions. The real Nagito is revealed to have implanted the hand of Junko Enoshima into his body following her death, showing also a romantic interest in Hajime's former persona, Izuru, and to have agreed to hand himself over to the Future Foundation to allow an artificial intelligence copy of Junko to inhabit his body. The computer avatar Nagito, upon learning of the truth of their reality and motivations, had arranged his own death in order to kill everyone but Chiaki, inadvertently fulfilling his real self's wishes.

In Danganronpa Another Episode: Ultra Despair Girls, Nagito appears under the title of Servant (召使い Meshitsukai), serving under the Warriors of Hope who had captured him. The Warriors of Hope frequently abused him, though he took it all with a smile. It is later revealed that he is manipulating the Warriors of Hope as the true mastermind, in order to allow Komaru Naegi to grow and defeat despair through her power of hope, before falling to become "the second generation of Junko Enoshima". Even though Ultra Despair Girls took place during the 77th class's time as Ultimate Despair, the Servant was unique in that he still longed for hope in his actions, whereas the others were fighting for despair alone. Following the defeat of the Warriors of Hope, the Servant carries away Monaca Towa, informing her that he will raise her to become "the second generation of Junko Enoshima" following her failure to have Komaru assume such a title.

Danganronpa anime
In the Despair Arc of Danganronpa 3: The End of Hope's Peak High School, Nagito is seen attending Hope's Peak but is suspended for bombing the school gym in a bid to postpone exams. When he returns, Nagito learns of Junko Enoshima's plans and attempts to shoot her with a gun. However, Izuru Kamukura, having been implanted with the talent of luck like Nagito, effortlessly prevents the attempt and shoots him instead. Although Nagito survives, he and his class are forced to watch Chiaki Nanami's death and are thus brainwashed into becoming members of Ultimate Despair loyal to Junko. He then comes to the conclusion that the best way to bring about hope for the world is to drive the world to the deepest levels of despair, setting up his role in Danganronpa Another Episode: Ultra Despair Girls as The Servant, and later in Danganronpa 2: Goodbye Despair.

The Servant makes a cameo at the beginning of the Future Arc, helping spread discord with the other Remnants of Despair after Junko is martyred, in his case by serving the Warriors of Hope. In "Ultra Despair Girls", Monaca Towa reveals to Toko Fukawa and Komaru Naegi that while the Servant successfully "made her an adult" and a replica of Junko, he also made her bored with both hope and despair, leading her to become a NEET, before sending herself to space.

In the Hope Arc of Danganronpa 3: The End of Hope's Peak High School, Nagito and the former Remnants of Despair wake up from their comas in the Neo World Program and massacre the Future Foundation forces of new mastermind, Ryota Mitarai. They convince him to join them in spreading despair worldwide in the name of hope, under the leadership of Izuru Kamukura, though in reality the group exiles themselves to atone for their deeds and prevent the collapse of the Future Foundation by acting as scapegoats. Before leaving, Nagito expresses excitement over briefly meeting "Ultimate Hope" Makoto Naegi in person, before being carried away by Nekomaru Nidai.

An original video animation, Nagito Komaeda and the Destroyer of Worlds, was also produced, featuring the alternate computer avatar Nagito trapped in a new virtual world his mind created to cope with his traumatic death in the Killing Game, leaving him comatose. An AI, World Destroyer, is sent in to kill off his illusory classmates, eventually resulting in the destruction of the fake reality. Nagito is then informed the world was created as reflection of his own desires, which he found embarrassing due to them being in direct conflict with his beliefs. With all of his memories intact, Nagito leaves Jabberwock Island with Hajime and the other students, setting up their cameo appearance in the Hope Arc.

Reception
Nagito has been a popular character. In an "Anime! Anime!" poll, Nagito was rated as the fifth most popular character voiced by Megumi Ogata. In a popularity poll from the franchise for the collected release of Trigger Happy Havoc and Goodbye Despair, Nagito took the first spot, behind Makoto Naegi. To celebrate, Rui Komatsuzaki did an illustration of the top five to be featured in the re-release of the games, Reload. In 2019, Nintenderos listed Nagito as the 25th most searched video game character in a poll involving Tumblr. Merchandings based on the character was also released alongside Hajime. In a 2021 poll, Nagito was voted as the best Danganronpa character. GameRant noted that there were multiple similarities between Nagito and Makoto Naegi which made several players confused to the point if they were related or even the same character especially because Ogata voices both of them in Japanese. Though not made relevant in the plot, it is also noted that Nagito has romantic feelings for Hajime Hinata due to subtle hints he shows in free events and CD dramas. The same site found him one of the most lovable characters in the entire franchise due to his striking personality and how he often tricks the audience during his appearances.
 
Reviewing the manga of Goodbye Despair, Anime UK News claimed that while Hajime is supposed to be the main character of the story, Nagito is more fitting for such role based on the behavior he demonstrates which makes him look "deranged than most" while also highlighting how different he is from his predecessor, Makoto. Siliconera described Nagito when first seeing as the "opposite being a flaky character" to Hajime and that he was "hopeful even though both of them are caught in a desperate situation." Koi-Nya stated that his early traits featured in the game might give previous gamers a sense of nostalgic due to having a caring personality like Makoto. However, the revelation of his dark self and skills when deducing murders in class trials made the reviewer claim that Nagito might be the most mysterious character in the entire game. Touch Arcade regarded Nagito and Ibuki as the game's best characters. Manga News felt that Nagito was an ambiguously evil person based on how often he tries to committee murders, most notably in the first trial when confessing he aimed to kill Byakuya Togami, but remains innocent as Teruteru made such action in his place. Anime News Network praised the character for "standing out" within the franchise, highlighting his similarities with Makoto and how different they are the same time. The reviewer enjoyed the actions the character has performed not only in the game but also the Despair Arc anime from the franchise as despite his kind demeanor, his commentaries make Hajime become corrupted across the narrative.

Both The Fandom Post Manga.Tokyo praised how multiple types of comedy that ensues in the Despair Arc due to Nagito's lucky talent such as how he mistakes drugs and causes two of his classmates, Seiko and Ruruka, to accidentally use laxative in meals and felt that Nagito's actions feel like a parallel to famous light novel character named Haruhi Suzumiya. In a later review, the same writer from Manga.Tokyo called Nagito as one of his favorite characters, believing his calm demeanor and distinctive design make an interesting parallel to Junko Enoshima. He also compared Nagito with Hajime's alterego, Izuru, due to both of them sharing multiple similarities, mainly their talents, and wondered whether the two would fight. Anime News Network enjoyed the encounter between Nagito and Izuru based on similar ideas like Manga.Tokyo but the felt this to be a form of fanservice that would appeal to players of Goodbye Despair as the two briefly interacted in Chapter 0 of the game.

Comic Book Resources listed Nagito as the 6th most intelligent Danganronpa character based on the multiple sides of his personalities as well as how he solves cases before Hajime and the rest of the cast from Goodbye Despair and, rather than solving the trials, he decides to leave them hints. The same site also found his role as an antagonist as one of the game's strongest points, claiming he "is complex, and he doesn't hide the fact that he's not all that mentally sound from the cast." Rice Digital listed Nagito as their favorite character from the franchise based on his actions that lead to his own death in the virtual world where he often threatens his mates with the possibility of destroying the establishment only to later orchestrate his death, which shocked the audience and the cast more when it is revealed that Nagito faked his suicide to reveal that Chiaki Nanami was his actual murderer.

References

Danganronpa characters
Fictional characters with alter egos
Fictional characters with amnesia
Fictional characters with major depressive disorder
Fictional mass murderers
Fictional private investigators
Fictional servants
Fictional slaves in video games
Fictional suicides
Fictional terrorists
Fictional torturers
Fictional Japanese people in video games
LGBT characters in video games
Male characters in video games
Video game characters introduced in 2012
Orphan characters in video games